Václav Holek (24 September 1886, Malé Nepodřice – 13 November 1954, Brno) was a Czechoslovak firearm engineer. He had applied for more than 75 patents during his active years.

Life 
Václav Holek was born in a village of Malé Nepodřice, southern Bohemia, in 1886. He completed his apprenticeship as a gunsmith and studied afterwards in the town of Písek. In 1905 he started working with an Anton Mulacz company in Vienna, from 1910 he had acquired a job with the gunsmith Jan Nowotný in Prague, where he took part in refining of Holland & Holland system shotguns. During World War I the company produced artillery guns for the Austro-Hungarian Army.

In 1918 Holek switched to the Zbrojovka Praga, a firearm company newly established by the son of Holek's former boss Jan Nowotný. Here a service semi-automatic pistol designated for the Czechoslovak Army and police designed by Holek came into existence. And it was here where, in the spring time of 1921, Václav Holek constructed a light machine gun from which the Czechoslovak Army light machine gun PRAGA vz. 24 was born, the predecessor of the ZB vz. 26 light machine gun. (Later,  British Royal Small Arms Factory of Enfield bought the license and produced some 220,000 of those guns marked as Bren.)

In December 1924 Holek switched to the Československá zbrojovka in Brno, where, in the 1930s, he developed the ZB-53 machine gun, of which 60.000 pieces marked as Besa machine gun were produced in Britain.

During World War II and in the post-war years Václav Holek developed a number of modern semi-automatic weapons out of which only the Vz. 52 light machine gun saw the production line.

References

Literature 
 Lubomir Popelinský: Československé automatické zbraně (Czechoslovak automatic weapons), Prague 1999

1886 births
1954 deaths
Engineers from the Austro-Hungarian Empire
Firearm designers
Czechoslovak engineers